The Las Vegas Show was an American late night television program broadcast in May 1967 on the short-lived United Network. The two-hour-long talk show, hosted by comedian Bill Dana, was supposed to be the flagship program of a planned fourth television network.

Overview
The show originated live from the Hotel Hacienda in Las Vegas, Nevada, and featured regulars Ann Elder, Pete Barbutti, Danny Meahan, Joanne Worley, Cully Richards and orchestra leader Jack Sheldon.

The series was seen on 106 television stations. The program was transmitted live on the United Network at 11PM ET / 10PM CT, though many stations, most of them affiliates of NBC, CBS or ABC, delayed the show until 11:30 PM ET, or even the afternoon hours the next day. Of those that did air the program during late night, many of these were CBS affiliates, as CBS did not have a late night program at the time.

However, The Las Vegas Show, the network's sole program, had difficulties finding sponsors and many local stations were "erratic in their support" for the new network. After just one month on the air the network effort failed; The Las Vegas Show (and the network itself) were cancelled.

Before the United Network folded, 23 episodes of The Las Vegas Show had aired. Two additional episodes remained unaired when network operations shut down.

References

1967 American television series debuts
1967 American television series endings
1960s American television talk shows
1960s American variety television series
English-language television shows
Television shows set in the Las Vegas Valley
1960s American late-night television series